Rantology is a compilation album by American industrial metal band Ministry. The album is made up of remixes of the band's singles and best known songs - with the exception of track 2 ("The Great Satan") which was first released here and became a live staple.

Track listing

Tracks 13, 14, and 15 are live versions taken from the Sphinctour live album.

Personnel
Al Jourgensen - vocals (1-7, 9-15), guitars (1-7, 10-12), bass (2), drum programming (2), lead guitar (8), slide guitar (8, 9), production, remixing, mastering
Mike Scaccia - guitars (1, 3-8, 12), lead guitar (1, 2, 6), bass (6)
Martha Cooper - feature vocals (1)
John Monte - bass (3, 7)
Mark Baker - drums (3, 7)
Paul Barker - bass (4, 5, 8-11, 13-14), programming (4, 5, 8-11), keyboard bass (15)
Bill Rieflin - drums (4, 8)
Michael Balch - programming (8)
Gibby Haynes - vocals (8)
Louis Svitek - guitar (9, 11, 13-15)
Rey Washam - drums (9, 11, 13-15)
Max Brody - drums and percussion (10, 11), programming (10)
Adam Grossman - guitar (10)
Zlatko Hukic - guitar (13-15)
Duane Buford - keyboards (13-15)
Darrell James - programming & assistant engineer
Dave Donnelly - mastering
Marco A. Ramirez - engineer
Jeff Magid - compilation producer
Paul Elledge - photography & art direction
Tim Bruce - design

References

2005 remix albums
Albums produced by Al Jourgensen
Ministry (band) albums
Sanctuary Records remix albums